Fenny Compton railway station was a railway station serving Fenny Compton in Warwickshire, England.

History
The Great Western Railway opened the station in 1852 on its Oxford and Rugby Railway. It would have formed the junction with its proposed Birmingham and Oxford Junction Railway.

In 1846 Parliamentary approval had also been sought for the Birmingham and Oxford Junction Railway. Parliament considered that the lines would provide useful competition for the London and Birmingham Railway which had become part of the London and North Western Railway. It gave approval subject to the lines being bought and operated by the GWR.

To discourage the GWR from proceeding, the LNWR approached the shareholders of the Oxford and Birmingham Company individually to buy their shares with view to forcing the price as high as possible - resulting in questions being asked in Parliament.

However, while the Regulating the Gauge of Railways Act 1846 required that all new railways should be built to standard gauge, the GWR had been given a number of dispensations to continue with its broad gauge, including its lines from  Oxford. The question arose of where the break-of-gauge should be – Oxford or Rugby – a dilemma the LNWR doubtless exploited. If the latter it would mean the GWR having a section of standard gauge line, including part of its Birmingham line. As a result, in August 1849 the section of the Rugby line north of Fenny Compton was abandoned. Then in 1848 Parliament ordered that the Oxford to Birmingham line be relaid to mixed gauge. By 1889 it was finally laid to standard gauge.

British Railways closed Fenny Compton station to passenger traffic from 2 November 1964. The GWR line remains as the present day Didcot to  line. A stub of the Stratford-upon-Avon line remains as a freight line leading to the MoD Kineton Military Railway. The station trackwork remains much as it was, but the platforms and most of the buildings have gone. Going north from Fenny Compton toward  the line curves gently to the right, on the course that would have taken it to  via Southam. After about  the line starts to curve to the left, and at this point, earthworks for the abandoned Rugby line are still visible curving away to the right.

Routes

References

External links
 Fenny Compton station's entry on Warwickshire Railways
 Fenny Compton station on navigable 1946 Ordnance Survey map

Railway stations in Great Britain opened in 1852
Railway stations in Great Britain closed in 1964
Disused railway stations in Warwickshire
Beeching closures in England
1852 establishments in England
Former Great Western Railway stations